The 1961 Tampa Spartans football team represented the University of Tampa in the 1961 NCAA College Division football season. It was the Spartans' 25th season. The team was led by head coach Marcelino Huerta, in his tenth year, and played their home games at Phillips Field in Tampa, Florida. They finished with a record of eight wins and one loss (8–1). Huerta resigned as the Spartans' head coach on January 8, 1962, to take the same position at Wichita State.

Schedule

References

Tampa
Tampa Spartans football seasons
Tampa Spartans football